This is a list of adult fiction books that topped The New York Times Fiction Best Seller list in 1967.

See also

 1967 in literature
 Publishers Weekly list of bestselling novels in the United States in the 1960s

References

1967
.
1967 in the United States